

Alpine skiing

World Junior Alpine Skiing Championships 2022 

 March 2 – 9: in  Panorama 
 Downhill winners:   Giovanni Franzoni (m) /  Magdalena Egger
Super G winners:  Isaiah Nelson (m) /  Magdalena Egger
Team parallel winners: 
Gigant slalom winners:  Alexander Steen Olsen (m) / /  Magdalena Egger
Slalom winners:  Alexander Steen Olsen (m) /  Zrinka Ljutić (f)
Alpine Combined winners:   Giovanni Franzoni (m) /  Marie Lamure

2021–22 FIS Alpine Ski World Cup
 October 23 & 24, 2021: WC #1 in  Sölden
 Giant Slalom winners:  Marco Odermatt (m) /  Mikaela Shiffrin (f)
 November 13 & 14, 2021: WC #2 in  Lech/Zürs
 Parallel Skiing winners:  Christian Hirschbühl (m) /  Andreja Slokar (f)
 November 20 & 21, 2021: WC #3 in  Levi (Women's only)
 Slalom winner:  Petra Vlhová (2 times)
 November 23–28, 2021: WC #4 in  Lake Louise (Men's only)
 Here Downhill #1 and Super G competitions are cancelled.
 Downhill #2 winner:  Matthias Mayer
 November 27 & 28, 2021: WC #5 in  Killington (Women's only)
 Here Giant Slalom competition are cancelled.
 Slalom winner:  Mikaela Shiffrin
 November 30 – December 5, 2021: WC #6 in  Beaver Creek (Men's only)
 Here Downhill #2 competition are cancelled.
 Super G winners:  Marco Odermatt (1st) /  Aleksander Aamodt Kilde (2nd)
 Downhill #1 winner:  Aleksander Aamodt Kilde
 November 30 – December 5, 2021: WC #7 in  Lake Louise (Women's only)
 Downhill winner:  Sofia Goggia (2 times)
 Super G winner:  Sofia Goggia
 December 11 & 12, 2021: WC #7 in  Val-d'Isère (Men's only)
 Giant Slalom winner:  Marco Odermatt
 Slalom winner:  Clément Noël
 December 11 & 12, 2021: WC #8 in  St. Moritz (Women's only)
 Super G winners:  Lara Gut-Behrami (1st) /  Federica Brignone (2nd)
 December 17 & 18, 2021: WC #9 in  Val Gardena/Gröden (Men's only)
 Super G winner:  Aleksander Aamodt Kilde
 Downhill winner:  Bryce Bennett
 December 18 & 19, 2021: WC #10 in  Val-d'Isère (Women's only)
 Downhill winner:  Sofia Goggia
 Super G winner:  Sofia Goggia
 December 19 & 20, 2021: WC #11 in  Alta Badia (Men's only)
 Giant Slalom winners:  Henrik Kristoffersen (1st) /  Marco Odermatt (2nd)
 December 21 & 22, 2021: WC #12 in  Courchevel (Women's only)
 Giant Slalom winners:  Mikaela Shiffrin (1st) /  Sara Hector (2nd)
 December 22, 2021: WC #13 in  Madonna di Campiglio (Men's only)
 Slalom winner:  Sebastian Foss-Solevåg
 December 26 – 29, 2021: WC #14 in  Bormio (Men's only)
 Here, the second Super G event is cancelled.
 Downhill winner:  Dominik Paris
 Super G winner:  Aleksander Aamodt Kilde
 December 28 & 29, 2021: WC #15 in  Lienz (Women's only)
 Giant Slalom winner:  Tessa Worley
 Slalom winner:  Petra Vlhová
 January 4 – 6: WC #16 in  Zagreb
  The Men's Slalom competition was cancelled on January 5 due to bad weather and was rescheduled to January 6, but cancelled in first run after 19 skiers due to bad weather conditions.
 Women's Slalom winner:  Petra Vlhová
 January 8 & 9: WC #17 in  Kranjska Gora (Women's only)
 Giant Slalom winner:  Sara Hector
 Slalom winner:  Petra Vlhová
 January 8 & 9: WC #18 in  Adelboden (Men's only)
 Giant Slalom winner:  Marco Odermatt
 Slalom winner:  Johannes Strolz
 January 11: WC #19 in  Schladming (Women's only)
 Slalom winner:  Mikaela Shiffrin
 January 13 – 16: WC #20 in  Wengen (Men's only)
 Super G winner:  Marco Odermatt
 Downhill winners:  Aleksander Aamodt Kilde (1st) /  Vincent Kriechmayr (2nd)
 Slalom winner:  Lucas Braathen
 January 13 – 16: WC #21 in  Zauchensee (Women's only)
 Downhill winner:  Lara Gut-Behrami
 Super G winner:  Federica Brignone
 January 18 – 23: WC #22 in  Kitzbühel (Men's only)
 Downhill winners:  Aleksander Aamodt Kilde (1st) /  Beat Feuz (2nd)
 Slalom winner:  Dave Ryding
 January 20 – 23: WC #23 in  Cortina d'Ampezzo (Women's only)
 Downhill winner:  Sofia Goggia
 Super G winner:  Elena Curtoni
 January 25: WC #24 in  Kronplatz (Plan de Corones) (Women's only)
 Giant Slalom winner:  Sara Hector
 January 25: WC #25 in  Schladming (Men's only)
 Slalom winner:  Linus Straßer
 January 27 – 30: WC #26 in  Garmisch-Partenkirchen (Women's only)
 Downhill winner:  Corinne Suter
 Super G winners:  Federica Brignone &  Cornelia Hütter (same time)
 February 24 – 27: WC #27 in  Crans-Montana (Women's only)
 Downhill winners:  Ester Ledecká (1st) /  Priska Nufer (2nd)
 February 26 & 27: WC #28 in  Garmisch-Partenkirchen (Men's only)
 Slalom winner:  Henrik Kristoffersen (2 times)
March 2 – 6: WC #29 in  Kvitfjell (Men's only)
Downhill winner:  Cameron Alexander (1st) /  Dominik Paris
Super G winner:   Aleksander Aamodt Kilde 
March 5 & 6: WC #30 in  Lenzerheide (Women's only)
Super G winner:  Romane Miradoli
Giant Slalom winner:  Tessa Worley
March 9: WC #31 in  Flachau (Men's only)
Slalom winner:  Atle Lie McGrath
March 11 & 12: WC #32 in  Are (Women's only)
Giant slalom winner:  Petra Vlhova 
Salom winner:  Katharina Liensberger 
March 12 & 13: WC #33 in  Kranjska Gora (Men's only)
Giant slalom winner: Henrik Kristoffersen (2 times)
March 14 & 20: WC Final in  Courchevel / Méribel
Downhill winners:  Vincent Kriechmayr (m) /  Mikaela Shiffrin (f)
Super G winners:  Vincent Kriechmayr (m) /  Ragnhild Mowinckel (f)
Team parallel winners:  (Delphine Darbellay, Livio Simonet, Andrea Ellenberger, Fadri Janutin)
Giant slalom winners:  Marco Odermatt (m) /  Federica Brignone (f)
Slalom winners:  Atle Lie McGrath (m) /  Andreja Slokar (f)

2021–22 FIS Alpine Ski Europa Cup 
 November 29 & 30, 2021: EC #1 in  Zinal (Men's only)
 Men's Super G winners:  Matteo Franzoso (1st) /  Giovanni Franzoni (2nd)
 November 29 & 30, 2021: EC #2 in  Mayrhofen (Women's only)
 Here 2nd Giant Slalom competition are cancelled.
 Giant Slalom #1 winner:  Charlotte Lingg
 December 2 & 3, 2021: EC #3 in  Thurn Pass (Women's only)
 Slalom winner:  Emma Aicher (2 times)
 December 2 & 3, 2021: EC #4 in  Kvitfjell (Women's only)
 Competition cancelled.
 December 2 & 3, 2021: EC #5 in  Zinal (Men's only)
 Giant Slalom winners:  Brian McLaughlin (1st) /  Cédric Noger (2nd)
 December 8 & 9, 2021: EC #6 in  Zinal (Women's only)
 Super G winners:  Christina Ager (1st) /  Elisabeth Reisinger (2nd)
 December 9–13, 2021: EC #7 in  Santa Caterina (Men's only)
 Downhill winners:  Yannick Chabloz (1st) /  Josua Mettler (2nd)
 Super G winner:  Ralph Weber
 December 11 & 12, 2021: EC #8 in  Andalo (Women's only)
 Giant Slalom winners:  Zrinka Ljutić (1st) /  Camille Rast (2nd)
 December 15, 2021: EC #9 in  Obereggen (Men's only)
 Slalom winner:  Alexander Steen Olsen
 December 15 & 16, 2021: EC #10 in  Valle Aurina (Women's only)
 Slalom winners:  Elsa Fermbäck (1st) /  Chiara Mair (2nd)
 December 16, 2021: EC #11 in  Val di Fassa (Men's only)
 Slalom winner:  Clément Noël
 December 18 – 21: EC #12 in  Val di Fassa (Women's only)
 Here the Super G competition is cancelled.
 Downhill winners:  Emily Schöpf (1st) /  Juliana Suter (2nd)
 December 19 & 20: EC #13 in  Glungezer (Men's only)
 Giant Slalom winner:  Joan Verdú Sánchez (2 times)
 January 7 & 8: EC #14 in  Berchtesgaden
 Slalom winners:  Joshua Sturm (1st) /  Billy Major (2nd)
 January 10 – 16: EC #15 in  Orcières-Merlette (Women's only)
 Downhill winners:  Juliana Suter (2 times)
 Giant Slalom winners:  Coralie Frasse Sombet (1st) /  Simone Wild (2nd)
 January 11 – 14: EC #16 in  Tarvisio (Men's only)
 Downhill winner:  Lars Rösti (2 times)
 January 19 & 20: EC #17 in  Meiringen-Hasliberg (Women's only)
 Slalom winner:  Aline Danioth (2 times) * January 20 & 21: EC #18 in  Vaujany
 Slalom winners:  Fabian Himmelsbach (1st) /  Fadri Janutin (2nd)
January 24 – 28: EC #19 in  St Anton (Women's only)
Downhill winners:  Esther Paslier (1st) /  Elena Dolmen (2nd)
Super G competitions are cancelled.
January 24 – 27: EC #20 in  Saalbach-Hinterglemm (Men's only)
Downhill winners:  James Crawford (1st) /  Jeffrey Read (2nd)
Super G winner:  Giovanni Franzoni
January 31 & February 1: EC #21 in  Zell am See (Women's only)
Slalom winner: Aline Danioth 
February 2: EC #22 in  Garmisch-Partenkirchen
Cancelled
February 3 & 4: EC #23 in  Sarntal (Women's only)
Super G winner:  Franziska Gritsch (2 times)
February 3 & 4: EC #24 in  Reiteralm (Men's only)
Giant slalom winner:  Joan Verdú Sánchez
February 9 & 10: EC #25 in  Kopaonik (Women's only)
Giant slalom winner:  Elisa Mörzinger
February 8 – 11: EC #26 in  Kvitfjell (Men's only)
Downhill winners:  Ralph Weber (1st) /   Cameron Alexander (2nd)
Super G winner:  Stefan Babinsky
February 12 & 13: EC #27 in  Maribor (Women's only)
Giant slalom winners:  Franziska Gritsch (1st) /   Lisa Nyberg (2nd)
February 14 – 19: EC #28 in  Oppdal (Men's only)
Super G winners:  Markus Fossland (1st) /   Giovanni Franzoni (2nd)
Giant slalom winners:  Joan Verdú Sánchez (1st) /   Fadri Janutin (2nd)
February 17 – 19: EC #29 in  Crans-Montana (Women's only)
Downhill winners:  Franziska Gritsch (1st) /   Inni Wembstad (2nd)
February 22 & 23: EC #30 in  Almaasa (Men's only)
Slalom winners:  Noel von Grünigen (1st) /   Steven Amiez (2nd)
February 24 & 25: EC #31 in  Bad Wiessee (Women's only)
Slalom winners:  Franziska Gritsch (2 times)
March 14 – 20: EC Final in  Soldeu/El Tarter
Downhill winners: Cancelled
Slalom winners:  Alexander Steen Olsen (m) /  Aline Danioth (f)
Giant slalom winners:  Sam Maes (m) /  Simone Wild (f)
Super G winners: Cancelled

2021–22 FIS Alpine Ski North American Cup
 November 18 – 23, 2021: NAC #1 & #2 in  Copper Mountain
 Men's Giant Slalom winners:  Andreas Žampa (1st) /  Thomas Tumler (2nd)
 Women's Giant Slalom winners:  Estelle Alphand (1st) /  Federica Brignone (2nd)
 Men's Slalom winners:  Liam Wallace (1st) /  Luke Winters (2nd)
 Women's Slalom winners:  Kiara Alexander (1st) /  Lila Lapanja (2nd)
 December 6 – 10, 2021: NAC #3 in  Lake Louise
 Men's Downhill winner:  Jeffrey Read (2 times)
 Women's Downhill winner:  Stefanie Fleckenstein (2 times)
 Super G winners:  Kyle Alexander (m) /  Candace Crawford (f)
 December 12 – 18, 2021: NAC #4 in  Panorama
 Here Alpine Combined and 1st Super G competitions are cancelled.
 Super G #2 winners:  Riley Seger (m) /  Alix Wilkinson (f)
 Parallel Giant Slalom winners:  Lukas Ermeskog (m) /  Cassidy Gray (f)
 Men's Giant Slalom winners:  Liam Wallace (1st) /  Cooper Cornelius (2nd)
 Women's Giant Slalom winners:  Cassidy Gray (1st) /  Sarah Bennett (2nd)
 Men's Slalom winners:  Adam Hofstedt (1st) /  Asher Jordan (2nd)
 Women's Slalom winner:  Amelia Smart (2 times)
February 8 & 9: NAC #5 in  Georgian Peaks (Women's only)
Gigant slalom winner:  Britt Richardson (2 times)
February 8 & 9: NAC #6 in  Whiteface Mountain (Men's only)
Gigant slalom winner:  Harry Laidlaw (2 times)
Super G winner:  Kyle Alexander (2 times)
Alpine combined winners:  Kyle Alexander (1st) /  Isaiah Nelson (2nd)
Slalom winners:  Benjamin Ritchie (1st) /  Liam Wallace (2nd)
February 10 & 11: NAC #7 in  Osler Bluff (Women's only)
Slalom winners:  Lila Lapanja (1st) /   Ava Jemison (2nd)
February 14 & 15: NAC #8 in  Burke Mountain (Men's only)
Gigant slalom winner:  Harry Laidlaw 
Slalom winner:   Fabian Ax
February 14 & 16: NAC #9 in  Whiteface Mountain (Women's only)
Gigant slalom winner:   Katie Hensien
Super G winners:  Candace Crawford (1st) /  Britt Richardson  (2nd)
Alpine combined winners:   Ava Jemison (1st) /  Kiara Alexander (2nd)
Slalom winner:  Arianne Forget
March 20 – April 1: NAC Final in  Sugarloaf
Downhill winners:  Jared Goldberg (m) (2 times) /  Isabella Wright (f) (2nd)
Super G winners: Cancelled
Gigant slalom winners:  Riley Seger (m) / Cancelled (f)
Slalom winners:  Benjamin Ritchie (m) /  Zoe Zimmermann (f)

Para Events 

 August 24 – 30, 2021: PARA #1 in  Coronet Peak 
 Cancelled
 September 16 & 17, 2021: PARA #2 in  Cardrona
 Cancelled
 November 19 & 20, 2021: PARA #3 in  Ski Dubai
 Cancelled
 November 24 – 26, 2021: PARA #4 in  Wanlong Ski Resort
 Men's slalom standing winner: ]] Xinjun Chen (2 times)
 Women's slalom standing winner:  Xiajin Guo (2 times)
 Men's slalom sitting winners:  Liang Chen (1st) /  Zilu Liang  (2nd)
 Women's slalom sitting winners:  Sitong Liu (1st) /  Wenjing Zhang (2nd)
 Women's slalom vision impaired winners:  Daqing Zhu / Hanhan Yan (2 times)
 Gigant slalom winners:
 Men's super G standing winners:  Yaniung Sun (1st) /   Shaojie Niu (2nd)
 Men's super G sitting winners:  Liang Chen (1st) /  Zilu Liang  (2nd)
 Women's super G standing winner: Xiajin Guo (2 times)
 Women's super G sitting winner:  Wenjing Zhang (2 times)
 Women's super G vision impaired winners:  Daqing Zhu / Hanhan Yan (2 times)
 November 24 – 26, 2021: PARA #5 in  Panorama 
 Cancelled
 November 27 & 28, 2021: PARA #6 in  Mittersill 
 Men's slalom standing winner:  Alexei Bugaev (2 times)
 Men's slalom sitting winners:  Hailing Yan (1st) /  Markus Gfatterhofer (2nd)
 Men's slalom vision impaired winners:  Johannes Aigner / Matteo Fleischmann (2 times)
 Women's slalom standing winner:  Mengqiu Zhang (1st) / Varvar Voronchikhina (2nd)
 Women's slalom sitting winner:  Anna-Lena Forster (2 times)
 Women's slalom vision impaired winners:  Menna Fitzpatrick / Katie Guest (2 times)
 December 1 – 5, 2021: PARA #7 in  Pitztaler Gletscher / S. Leonhard
 Cancelled
 December 7 – 10, 2021: PARA #8 in  Steinach am Brenner
 Cancelled
 December 13 & 14, 2021: PARA #9 in  Steinach am Brenner
 Men's super G standing winner:  Jingyl Liang (2 times)
 Men's super G sitting winner:  Jesper Pedersen (2 times)
 Men's super G vission impaired winners:  Nell Simpson / Andrew Simpson (2 times)
 Women's super G standing winner:  Mengqiu Zhang (2 times)
 Women's super G sitting winners:  Momoka Muraoka (1st) /  Barbara Van Bergen (2nd)
 Women's super G vission impaired winners:  Menna Fitzpatrick / Katie Guest (2 times)
 Gigant slalom standing winners:  Jingyl Liang (m) /  Mengqiu Zhang (w)
 Gigant slalom sitting winners:  Jesper Pedersen (m) /  Momoka Muraoka (w)
 Gigant slalom vission impaired winners:  Nell Simpson / Andrew Simpson (m) /  Menna Fitzpatrick / Katie Guest (w)
 December 17 – 21, 2021: PARA #10 in  St. Moritz
 Men's gigant slalom standing winners:  Ther Gmuer (1st) /  Arthur Bauchet (2 times)
 Men's gigant slalom sitting winners:  Rene' De Silvestro (1st) /  Jeroen Kampschreur (2 times)
 Men's gigant slalom vission impaired winners:   Nell Simpson / Andrew Simpson (1st) /  Johannes Aigner / Matteo Fleischmann (2nd)/  Giacomo Bertagnolli / Andrea Ravelli (3rd) 
 Women's gigant slalom standing winners:  Ebba Aarsjoe (2nd) /  Mollie Jepsen (2 times)
 Women's gigant slalom sitting winners: Anna-Lena Forster (1st) /  Momoka Muraoka (2 times)
 Women's gigant slalom vission impaired winners:  Henrieta Farkasova / Michal Cerven (3 times)
 Men's slalom standing winner:  Arthur Bauchet (2 times)
 Men's slalom sitting winners:  Jesper Pedersen (1st) /  Jeroen Kampschreur (2nd)
 Men's slalom vision impaired winners:  Johannes Aigner / Matteo Fleischmann (2 times)
 Women's slalom standing winner:  Ebba Aarsjoe (1st) /  Marie Bochet (2nd)
 Women's slalom sitting winner:  Momoka Muraoka (2 times)
 Women's slalom vision impaired winners:  Barbara Aigner / Kiara Sykora (2 times)
 January 4 – 6: PARA #11 in  Winter Park Resort
 Men's gigant slalom standing winner:  Tyler McKenzie (2 times)
 Men's gigant slalom sitting winners:  David Allen Williams (1st) /  Aaron Ewen (2nd)
 Men's gigant slalom vission impaired winners:   Ronan Griffin / Elle Kate Murphy (2 times)
 Women's gigant slalom standing winner:  Saylor O'Brien (2 times)
 Women's gigant slalom sitting winner:  Audrey Crowley (2 times)
 Women's gigant slalom vission impaired winners:  Danelle Umstead / Rob Umstead (2 times)
 Men's slalom standing winner:  Adam Hall (2 times)
 Men's slalom sitting winner:  Aaron Ewen (2 times)
 Men's slalom vision impaired winners:  Mikhail Simanov / Richard Bolog (1st) /  Ronan Griffin / Elle Kate Murphy (2nd)
 Women's slalom standing winner:  Rae Anderson (2 times)
 Women's slalom sitting winner:  Saylor O'Brien (2 times)
 Women's slalom vision impaired winners:  Danelle Umstead / Rob Umstead (2 times)
 January 11 – 26: PARA #12 in  Hafjell
 Cancelled
 January 18 – 22:  PARA #13 in  Beidahu Ski Resort
 Cancelled
 January 27 – 30:  PARA #13 in  Are 
 Cancelled
 January 28 – 30:  PARA #14 in  Les Angles
 Cancelled
 February 2 – 4: PARA #15 in  Sugadaira
 Men's super G standing winner:  Masahiko Tokai (2 times)
 Men's super G sitting winners:  Akira Kano (1st) /  Takeshi Suzuki (2nd)
 Women's super G standing winner:  Noriko Kamiyama (2 times)
 Women's super G sitting winner:  Yoshiko Tanaka 
 Men's gigant slalom standing winner:  Masahiko Tokai (2 times)
 Men's gigant slalom sitting winners:  Tetzu Fijuwara (1st) /  Taiki Morii (2nd)
 Women's gigant slalom standing winner:  Noriko Kamiyama (2 times)
 Women's gigant slalom sitting winners:  Tetzu Fijuwara (1st) /  Taiki Morii (2nd)
 Men's slalom standing winner:  Masahiko Tokai 
 Men's slalom sitting winner:  Takeshi Suzuki 
 Women's slalom standing winner:  Noriko Kamiyama
 Women's slalom sitting winner:  Yoshiko Tanaka 
 February 7 – 13: PARA #16 in  Veysonnaz
 Cancelled
 February 8 – 10: PARA #17 in  Park City
 Men's gigant slalom standing winner:  Patrick Halgren (2 times)
 Men's gigant slalom sitting winner:  Matthew Ryan Brewer (2 times)
 Men's gigant slalom vission impaired winners:   Michael Kear / Louise Harrison (2 times)
 Women's gigant slalom standing winner:  Rae Anderson (2 times)
 Women's gigant slalom sitting winner:  Saylor O'Brien (2 times)
 Men's slalom standing winner:  Andrew Haraghey (2 times)
 Men's slalom sitting winners:  Zachary Williams (1st) /  Kyle Taulman (2nd)
 Men's slalom vision impaired winners:  Michael Kear / Louise Harrison (2 times)
 Women's slalom standing winners:  Rae Anderson (1st) /  Tess Breasant (2nd)
 Women's slalom sitting winner:  Saylor O'Brien (2 times)
 Women's slalom vision impaired winners:  Danelle Umstead / Rob Umstead (2 times)
 February 10 – 13: PARA #18 in  Rokytnice nad Jizerou
 Cancelled
 February 22 & 23: PARA #19 in  Tasghkador
 Cancelled
 March 7 & 8:  PARA #20 in  Peisey-Vallandry
 Cancelled
 March 19 & 20:  PARA #21 in  Prapoutel
 Cancelled
 March 25 & 27:  PARA #22 in  Montgenèvre
 Super G winners:
Gigant slalom winners:
Slalom winners:
 March 28 – April 1: PARA #23 in  Axams
 Downhill winners:
Super G winners:
Gigant slalom winners:
Slalom winners:
 April 2 & 3: PARA #24 in  Kuehtai
 Gigant slalom winners:
Slalom winners:
 April 2 & 3: PARA #25 in  Lenzerheide
 Gigant slalom winners:
Slalom winners:
 April 2 – 6: PARA #26 in  Winter Park Resort
 Super G winners:
Gigant slalom winners:
Slalom winners:
 April 5 – 8: PARA #27 in  Nozawa Onsen
 Gigant slalom winners:
Slalom winners:
 April 8 – 10: PARA #28 in  Mellau
 Gigant slalom winners:
Slalom winners:

Biathlon
 January 19 – 23: 2022 IBU Junior Open European Championships in  Pokljuka
 Men's 15 km individual winner:  Blagoy Todev
 Women's 12.5 km individual winner:  Camille Coupé
 Sprint winners:  Jonáš Mareček (m) /  Selina Grotian (f)
 Pursuit winners:  Paul Fontaine (m) /  Selina Grotian (f)
 Mixed single relay winners:  (Johanna Puff & Darius Lodl)
 Mixed Team relay winners:  (Camille Coupé, Jeanne Richard, Damien Levet, Jacques Jefferies)
 January 26–30: 2022 IBU Open European Championships in  Arber
 Men's 20 km individual winner:  Sverre Dahlen Aspenes
 Women's 15 km individual winner:  Evgeniya Burtasova
 Sprint winners:  Erlend Bjøntegaard (m) /  Ragnhild Femsteinevik (f)
 Pursuit winners:  Sverre Dahlen Aspenes (m) /  Alina Stremous (f)
 Mixed single relay winners:  (Anton Babikov & Evgeniya Burtasova)
 Mixed Team relay winners:  (Erlend Bjøntegaard, Johannes Dale, Jenny Enodd, Ragnhild Femsteinevik)

2022 Winter Olympics
 February 5 – 19: 2022 Winter Olympics in  Beijing
 Mixed Relay 4x6km winners: : , : , :

2021–22 Biathlon World Cup
 November 27 – 28, 2021: WC #1 in  Östersund #1
 Men's 20 km Individual winner:  Sturla Holm Lægreid
 Women's 15 km Individual winner:  Markéta Davidová
 Men's 10 km Sprint winner:  Sebastian Samuelsson
 Women's 7.5 km Sprint winner:  Hanna Öberg
 December 2 – 5, 2021: WC #2 in  Östersund #2
 Men's 10 km Sprint winner:  Sebastian Samuelsson
 Women's 7.5 km Sprint winner:  Lisa Theresa Hauser
 Men's 12.5 km Pursuit winner:  Vetle Sjåstad Christiansen
 Women's 10 km Pursuit winner:  Marte Olsbu Røiseland
 Men's 4x7.5 km Relay winners:  (Sivert Guttorm Bakken, Tarjei Bø, Johannes Thingnes Bø, Vetle Sjåstad Christiansen)
 Women's 4x6 km Relay winners:  (Anaïs Bescond, Anaïs Chevalier-Bouchet, Julia Simon, Justine Braisaz-Bouchet)
 December 10 – 12, 2021: WC #3 in  Hochfilzen
 Men's 10 km Sprint winner:  Johannes Kühn
 Women's 7.5 km Sprint winner:  Hanna Sola
 Men's 12.5 km Pursuit winner:  Quentin Fillon Maillet
 Women's 10 km Pursuit winner:  Marte Olsbu Røiseland
 Women's 4x6 km Relay winners:  (Linn Persson, Anna Magnusson, Elvira Öberg, Hanna Öberg)
 Men's 4x7.5 km Relay winners:  (Sturla Holm Lægreid, Tarjei Bø, Johannes Thingnes Bø, Vetle Sjåstad Christiansen)
 December 16 – 19, 2021: WC #4 in  Le Grand-Bornand
 Women's 7.5 km Sprint winner:  Marte Olsbu Røiseland
 Men's 10 km Sprint winner:  Johannes Thingnes Bø
 Women's 10 km Pursuit winner:  Elvira Öberg
 Men's 12.5 km Pursuit winner:  Quentin Fillon Maillet
 Women's 12.5 km Mass Start winner:  Elvira Öberg
 Men's 15 km Mass Start winner:  Émilien Jacquelin
 January 7 – 9: WC #5 in  Oberhof
 Men's 10 km Sprint winner:  Alexandr Loginov
 Women's 7.5 km Sprint winner:  Marte Olsbu Røiseland
 Mixed 4x7.5 km Relay winners:  (Tarjei Bø, Johannes Thingnes Bø, Ingrid Landmark Tandrevold, Marte Olsbu Røiseland)
 Mixed 1x6 km+1x7.5 km Single Relay winners:  Anton Babikov & Kristina Reztsova
 Men's 12.5 km Pursuit winner:  Quentin Fillon Maillet
 Women's 10 km Pursuit winner:  Marte Olsbu Røiseland
 January 12 – 16: WC #6 in  Ruhpolding
 Women's 7.5 km Sprint winner:  Elvira Öberg
 Men's 10 km Sprint winner:  Quentin Fillon Maillet
 Women's 4x6 km Relay winners:  (Anaïs Chevalier-Bouchet, Chloé Chevalier, Justine Braisaz-Bouchet, Julia Simon)
 Men's 4x7.5 km Relay winners:  (Said Karimulla Khalili, Daniil Serokhvostov, Alexander Loginov, Maxim Tsvetkov)
 Women's 10 km Pursuit winner:  Marte Olsbu Røiseland
 Men's 12.5 km Pursuit winner:  Quentin Fillon Maillet
 January 20 – 23: WC #7 in  Antholz-Anterselva
 Men's 20 km Individual winner:  Anton Babikov
 Women's 15 km Individual winner:  Justine Braisaz-Bouchet
 Men's 15 km Mass Start winner:  Benedikt Doll
 Women's 4x6 km Relay winners:  (Karoline Offigstad Knotten, Tiril Eckhoff, Ida Lien, Ingrid Landmark Tandrevold)
 Men's 4x7.5 km Relay winners:  (Sturla Holm Lægreid, Tarjei Bø, Johannes Thingnes Bø, Vetle Sjåstad Christiansen)
 Women's 12.5 km Mass Start winner:  Dorothea Wierer
 March 3 – 6: WC #8 in  Kontiolahti
 Women's 4x6 km Relay winners:  (Marte Olsbu Røiseland, Tiril Eckhoff, Ida Lien, Ingrid Landmark Tandrevold)
 Men's 4x7.5 km Relay winners:  (Sivert Guttorm Bakken, Filip Fjeld Andersen, Sturla Holm Lægreid, Vetle Sjåstad Christiansen)
 Women's 7.5 km Sprint winner:  Denise Herrmann
 Men's 10 km Sprint winner:  Quentin Fillon Maillet
 Women's 10 km Pursuit winner:  Tiril Eckhoff
 Men's 12.5 km Pursuit winner:  Quentin Fillon Maillet
 March 10 – 13: WC #9 in  Otepää
 Men's 10 km Sprint winner:  Quentin Fillon Maillet
 Women's 7.5 km Sprint winner:  Julia Simon
 Men's 15 km Mass Start winner:  Vetle Sjåstad Christiansen
 Women's 12.5 km Mass Start winner:  Elvira Öberg
 Mixed 4x7.5 km Relay winners:  (Sivert Guttorm Bakken, Vetle Sjåstad Christiansen, Tiril Eckhoff, Ingrid Landmark Tandrevold)
 Mixed 1x6 km+1x7.5 km Single Relay winners:  Sturla Holm Lægreid & Marte Olsbu Røiseland
 March 18 – 20: WC #10 in  Oslo Holmenkollen
 Women's 7.5 km Sprint winner:  Tiril Eckhoff
 Men's 10 km Sprint winner:  Sturla Holm Lægreid
 Women's 10 km Pursuit winner:  Tiril Eckhoff
 Men's 12.5 km Pursuit winner:  Erik Lesser 
 Women's 12.5 km Mass Start winner:  Justine Braisaz-Bouchet
 Men's 15 km Mass Start winner:  Sivert Guttorm Bakken

2021–22 Biathlon IBU Cup
 November 25–28, 2021: IBU Cup #1 in  Idre
 Men's Sprint winners:  Lucas Fratzscher (1st) /  Aleksander Fjeld Andersen (2nd)
 Women's Sprint winners:  Marion Wiesensarter (1st) /  Franziska Hildebrand (2nd)
 Pursuit winners:  Vasilii Tomshin (m) /  Franziska Hildebrand (f)
 December 1–4, 2021: IBU Cup #2 in  Sjusjøen
 Super Sprint winners:  Filip Fjeld Andersen (m) /  Linda Zingerle (f)
 Sprint winners:  Anton Babikov (m) /  Anastasia Shevchenko (f)
 Mass start winners:  Anton Babikov (m) /  Ragnhild Femsteinevik (f)
 December 16–19, 2021: IBU Cup #3 in  Obertilliach
 Men's 20 km Individual winner:  David Zobel
 Women's 15 km Individual winner:  Elisabeth Högberg
 Sprint winners:  Håvard Gutubø Bogetveit (m) /  Anastasia Shevchenko (f)
 Single Mixed Relay winners:  (Evgeniya Burtasova & Anton Babikov)
 Mixed Relay winners:  (Anastasia Shevchenko, Anastasiia Goreeva, Nikita Porshnev, Maxim Tsvetkov)
 January 8 & 9: IBU Cup #4 in  Brezno-Osrblie
 Men's Sprint winners:  Aleksander Fjeld Andersen (1st) /  Sindre Fjellheim Jorde (2nd)
 Women's Sprint winners:  Ragnhild Femsteinevik (1st) /  Larisa Kuklina (2nd)
 January 12–15: IBU Cup #5 in  Brezno-Osrblie
 Short Individual winners:  Vetle Paulsen (m) /  Janina Hettich (f)
 Sprint winners:  Émilien Claude (m) /  Camille Bened (f)
 Women's Pursuit winner:  Evgeniya Burtasova
 January 26–30: IBU Cup #6 in  Arber (2022 IBU Open European Championships)
 Men's 20 km individual winner:  Sverre Dahlen Aspenes
 Women's 15 km individual winner:  Evgeniya Burtasova
 Sprint winners:  Erlend Bjøntegaard (m) /  Ragnhild Femsteinevik (f)
 Pursuit winners:  Sverre Dahlen Aspenes (m) /  Alina Stremous (f)
 Mixed single relay winners:  (Anton Babikov & Evgeniya Burtasova)
 Mixed Team relay winners:  (Erlend Bjøntegaard, Johannes Dale, Jenny Enodd, Ragnhild Femsteinevik)
 February 3–5: IBU Cup #7 in  Nové Město
 March 3–6: IBU Cup #8 in  Lenzerheide
 March 10–13: IBU Cup #9 in  Ridnaun-Val Ridanna (final)

Cross-country skiing

2022 Winter Olympics
 February 5 – 20: Cross-country skiing at the 2022 Winter Olympics in  Beijing
 Women's Skiathlon: :  Therese Johaug, :  Natalya Nepryayeva, :  Teresa Stadlober

2021–22 FIS Cross-Country World Cup
 November 26–28, 2021: WC #1 in  Ruka
 Sprint Classic winners:  Alexander Terentyev (m) /  Maja Dahlqvist (f)
 Men's 15 km Classic winner:  Iivo Niskanen
 Women's 10 km Classic winner:  Frida Karlsson
 Men's 15 km Freestyle Pursuit winner:  Alexander Bolshunov
 Women's 10 km Freestyle Pursuit winner:  Therese Johaug
 December 3–5, 2021: WC #2 in  Lillehammer
 Sprint Freestyle winners:  Johannes Høsflot Klæbo (m) /  Maja Dahlqvist (f)
 Men's 15 km Freestyle winner:  Simen Hegstad Krüger
 Women's 10 km Freestyle winner:  Frida Karlsson
 Men's 4 x 7.5 km Relay C/F winners:  I (Erik Valnes, Emil Iversen, Simen Hegstad Krüger, Johannes Høsflot Klæbo)
 Women's 4 x 5 km Relay C/F winners:  I (Yuliya Stupak, Natalya Nepryayeva, Tatiana Sorina, Veronika Stepanova)
 December 11 & 12, 2021: WC #3 in  Davos
 Sprint Freestyle winners:  Johannes Høsflot Klæbo (m) /  Maja Dahlqvist (f)
 Men's 15 km Freestyle winner:  Simen Hegstad Krüger
 Women's 10 km Freestyle winner:  Therese Johaug
 December 18 & 19, 2021: WC #4 in  Dresden
 Sprint Freestyle winners:  Håvard Solås Taugbøl (m) /  Maja Dahlqvist (f)
 Men's Team Sprint Freestyle winners:  II (Thomas Helland Larsen & Even Northug)
 Women's Team Sprint Freestyle winners:  I (Jonna Sundling & Maja Dahlqvist)
 December 28 & 29: WC #5 in  Lenzerheide (1st round of 2021–22 Tour de Ski)
 Sprint Freestyle winners:  Johannes Høsflot Klæbo (m) /  Jessie Diggins (f)
 Men's 15 km Classic winner:  Iivo Niskanen
 Women's 10 km Classic winner:  Kerttu Niskanen
 December 31, 2021 & January 1: WC #6 in  Oberstdorf (2nd round of 2021–22 Tour de Ski)
 Men's 15 km Freestyle Mass Start winner:  Johannes Høsflot Klæbo
 Women's 10 km Freestyle Mass Start winner:  Jessie Diggins
 Sprint Classic winners:  Johannes Høsflot Klæbo (m) /  Natalya Nepryayeva (f)
 January 3 & 4: WC #7 in  Val di Fiemme (3rd round of 2021–22 Tour de Ski)
 Women's 10 km Classic Mass Start winner:  Natalya Nepryayeva
 Men's 15 km Classic Mass Start winner:  Johannes Høsflot Klæbo
 Women's 10 km Freestyle Mass Start Climb winner:  Heidi Weng
 Men's 10 km Freestyle Mass Start Climb winner:  Sjur Røthe
 2021–22 Tour de Ski winners:  Johannes Høsflot Klæbo (m) /  Natalya Nepryayeva
 January 14 – 16: WC #8 in  Les Rousses
 Cancelled due to the COVID-19 pandemic.
 January 22 & 23: WC #9 in  Planica
 Cancelled due to the COVID-19 pandemic.
 February 26 & 27: WC #10 in  Lahti
 Sprint Freestyle winners:  Johannes Høsflot Klæbo (m) /  Jonna Sundling (f)
 Women's 10 km Classic winner:  Therese Johaug
 Men's 15 km Classic winner:  Iivo Niskanen
 March 3: WC #11 in  Drammen
 Sprint Classic winners:  Richard Jouve (m) /  Maiken Caspersen Falla (f)
 March 5 & 6: WC #12 in  Oslo
 Women's 30 km Classic Mass Start winner:  Therese Johaug
 Men's 50 km Classic Mass Start winner:  Martin Løwstrøm Nyenget
 March 11 – 13: WC #13 in  Falun
 Sprint Classic winners:  Richard Jouve (m) /  Jonna Sundling (f)
 Men's 15 km Freestyle winner:  Didrik Tønseth
 Women's 10 km Freestyle winner:  Therese Johaug
 4 x 5 km Mixed Relay Freestyle winners:  I (Rosie Brennan, Zak Ketterson, Scott Patterson, Jessie Diggins)
 Mixed Team Sprint Freestyle winners:  I (Jonna Sundling & Calle Halfvarsson)

2021–22 FIS Cross-Country Continental Cup

2021–22 OPA Cross Country Alpen Cup
 December 3–5, 2021: OPA #1 in  Ulrichen
 Men's 15 km Classic winner:  Albert Küchler
 Women's 10 km Classic winner:  Katherine Sauerbrey
 Men's 1.5 km Sprint Freestyle winner:  Francesco Manzoni
 Women's 1.3 km Sprint Freestyle winner:  Lisa Unterweger
 Men's 15 km Freestyle Mass Start winner:  Tom Mancini
 Women's 10 km Freestyle Mass Start winner:  Katherine Sauerbrey
 December 18 & 19, 2021: OPA #2 in  Sankt Ulrich am Pillersee
 Men's 15 km Classic winner:  Evgeniy Belov
 Women's 10 km Classic winner:  Katherine Sauerbrey
 Men's 15 km Freestyle Mass Start winner:  Cyril Fähndrich
 Women's 10 km Freestyle Mass Start winner:  Katherine Sauerbrey
 January 7 – 9: OPA #3 in  Nové Město na Moravě
 Cancelled, moved to Sankt Ulrich am Pillersee
 January 8 & 9: OPA #3 in  Sankt Ulrich am Pillersee
 Sprint Freestyle winners:  Valerio Grond (m) /  Alina Meier (f)
 Men's 15 km Classic winner:  Jason Rüesch
 Women's 10 km Classic winner:  Nadja Kälin
 January 22 & 23: OPA #4 in  Oberstdorf
 Sprint Classic winners:  Jules Chappaz (m) /  Laura Gimmler (f)
 Men's 30 km Freestyle Mass Start winner:  Jason Rüesch
 Women's 20 km Freestyle Mass Start winner:  Lisa Lohmann

2021 Australia/New Zealand Cup
 August 7 & 8, 2021: ANC #1 in  Perisher Valley
 1.2 km Sprint Freestyle winners:  Phillip Bellingham (m) /  Casey Wright (f)
 Men's 15 km Classic winner:  Phillip Bellingham
 Women's 10 km Classic winner:  Casey Wright
 September 4 & 5, 2021: ANC #2 in  Falls Creek (final)
 Competition cancelled.
 Overall winners:  Phillip Bellingham (m) /  Casey Wright (f)

2022 FIS Cross-Country Balkan Cup
 January 12 & 13: BC #1 in  Zlatibor
 Men's 10 km Classic winners:  Daniel Peshkov (1st) /  Bernat Sellés Gasch (2nd)
 Women's 5 km Classic winner:  Marta Moreno Ramos (2 times)

2021–22 FIS Cross-Country Eastern Europe Cup
 November 13 – 15, 2021: EEC #1 in  Shchuchinsk
 1.2 km Sprint Classic winners:  Andrey Kuznetsov (m) /  Nataliya Mekryukova (f)
 Men's 10 km Classic winner:  Andrey Kuznetsov
 Women's 5 km Classic winner:  Nataliya Mekryukova
 Men's 15 km Freestyle winner:  Sergey Volkov
 Women's 10 km Freestyle winner:  Ekaterina Smirnova
 November 27 – December 1, 2021: EEC #2 in  Vershina Tyoi
 Men's 1.7 Sprint Classic winners:  Andrey Kuznetsov (1st) /  Fedor Nazarov (2nd)
 Women's 1.5 Sprint Classic winners:  Alesya Rushentseva (1st) /  Ekaterina Smirnova (2nd)
 Men's 15 km Freestyle winner:  Ilya Proshkin
 Women's 10 km Freestyle winner:  Evgeniya Krupitskaya
 Men's 15 km Classic winner:  Ilya Proshkin
 Women's 10 km Classic winner:  Dariya Nepryaeva
 December 18 – 21, 2021: EEC #3 in  Kirovo-Chepetsk
 Sprint Freestyle winners:  Sergey Ardashev (m) /  Olga Kucheruk (f)
 Men's 15 km Fresstyle winner:  Andrey Larkov
 Women's 10 km Freestyle winner:  Ekaterina Smirnova
 Men's 30 km Classic winner:  Andrey Larkov
 Women's 15 km Classic winner:  Ekaterina Smirnova
 January 4 – 7: EEC #4 in  Minsk–Raubichi
 Sprint Freestyle winners:  Sergey Ardashev (m) /  Anastasia Kirillova (f)
 Men's 10 km Classic winner:  Ilya Poroshkin
 Women's 5 km Classic winner:  Anastasia Kirillova
 Men's 30 km Freestyle Must Start winner:  Andrey Larkov
 Women's 15 km Freestyle Must Start winner:  Hanna Karaliova

2022 FIS Cross-Country Nor-Am Cup
 January 6 – 11: NAC #1 in  Canmore (final)
 Sprint Freestyle winners:  Antoine Cyr (m) /  Laura Leclair (f)
 Men's 15 km Classic winner:  Antoine Cyr
 Women's 10 km Classic winner:  Katherine Stewart-Jones
 Men's 30 km Freestyle Mass Start winner:  Russell Kennedy
 Women's 15 km Freestyle Mass Start winner: Katherine Stewart-Jones
 Sprint Classic winners:  Xavier McKeever (m) /  Olivia Bouffard-Nesbitt (f)
 Overall winners:  Antoine Cyr (m) /  Katherine Stewart-Jones (f)

2021–22 FIS Alpine Ski Far East Cup
 December 25 – 27, 2021: FEC #1 in  Otoineppu
 cancelled, moved to Pyeongchang on the same dates.
 December 25 – 27, 2021: FEC #1 in  Pyeongchang
 Men's 10 km Classic winner:  Kim Min-woo
 Women's 5 km Classic winner:  Lee Eui-jin
 Men's 10 km Freestyle winner:  Kim Eun-ho
 Women's 5 km Freestyle winner:  Lee Chae-won
 January 8 – 10: FEC #2, #3 and #4 in  Sapporo
 Men's 10 km Classic winner:  Ryo Hirose
 Women's 5 km Classic winner:  Masao Tsuchiya
 Men's 10 km Freestyle winner:  Haruki Yamashita
 Women's 5 km Freestyle winner:  Masao Tsuchiya
 Sprint Classic winners:  Takanori Ebina (m) /  Miki Kodama (f)
 January 18 – 19: FEC #5 in  Alpensia
 Men's 10 km Classic winner:  Byun Ji-yeong
 Women's 5 km Classic winner:  Lee Eui-jin
 Men's 10 km Freestyle winner:  Jeong Jong-won
 Women's 5 km Freestyle winner:  Lee Chae-won

2021–22 Scandinavian Cup
 December 10 – 12, 2021: SCAN #1 in  Beitostølen
 Men's 15 km Classic winner:  Didrik Tønseth
 Women's 10 km Classic winner:  Silje Theodorsen
 Sprint Classic winners:  Aron Åkre Rysstad (m) /  Anna Svendsen (f)
 Men's 15 km Freestyle winner:  Didrik Tønseth
 Women's 10 km Freestyle winner:  Silje Theodorsen
 January 7 – 9: SCAN #2 in  Falun
 Sprint Freestyle winners:  Karl-Johan Westberg (m) /  Jonna Sundling (f)
 Men's 15 km Classic winner:  William Poromaa
 Women's 10 km Classic winner:  Jonna Sundling
 Men's 15 km Freestyle winner:  William Poromaa
 Women's 10 km Freestyle winner:  Jonna Sundling

2021–22 Slavic Cup
 December 18 & 19, 2021: SC #1 in  Štrbské Pleso
 Cancelled.
 January 11 – 12: SC #2 in  Zakopane
 Sprint Freestyle winners:  Dominik Bury (m) /  Monika Skinder (f)
 Men's 15 km Classic winner:  Dominik Bury
 Women's 10 km Classic winner:  Izabela Marcisz

2021–22 US SuperTour
 December 4 & 5, 2021: UST #1 in  Spirit Mountain
 Sprint Freestyle winners:  Tyler Kornfield (m) /  Becca Rorabaugh (f)
 Men's 10 km Freestyle winner:  Zak Ketterson
 Women's 5 km Freestyle winner:  Rosie Frankowski
 December 10 – 12, 2021: UST #2 in  Cable
 Mass Start winners:  Philippe Boucher (m) /  Rosie Frankowski (f)
 Sprint Classic winners:  Zak Ketterson (m) /  Alayna Sonnesyn (f)
 Men's 15 km Classic winner:  Adam Martin
 Women's 10 km Classic winner:  Alayna Sonnesyn (f)
 January 7: UST #3 in  Soldier Hollow
 Sprint Classic winners:  Magnus Bøe (m) /  Katharine Ogden (f)
 January 15 & 16: UST #4 in  Lake Creek Nordic Center
 Men's 10 km Freestyle winner:  John Steel Hagenbuch
 Women's 5 km Freestyle winner:  Rosie Brennan
 Mass Start winners:  David Norris (m) /  Rosie Brennan (f)

Freestyle skiing

2021–22 FIS Freestyle Ski World Cup
Aerials
 December 2 & 3, 2021: WC #1 in  Ruka
 Men's winner:  Maxim Burov (2 times)
 Women's winners:  Kong Fanyu (1st) /  Xu Mengtao (2nd)
 Teams winner:  (Xu Mengtao, Jia Zongyang, Qi Guangpu)
 December 10 & 11, 2021: WC #2 in  Ruka
 Men's winner:  Maxim Burov (2 times)
 Women's winners:  Anastasiya Novosad (1st) /  Danielle Scott (2nd)
 Teams winner:  (Xu Mengtao, Sun Jiaxu, Qi Guangpu)
 January 6: WC #3 in  Le Relais
 Winners:  Sun Jiaxu (m) /  Xu Mengtao (f)
 January 12: WC #4 in  Deer Valley
 Winners:  Wang Xindi (m) /  Laura Peel (f)
 World Cup winners:  Maxim Burov (m) /  Xu Mengtao (f)

Freeski Big Air
 October 22, 2021: WC #1 in  Chur
 Winners:  Matěj Švancer (m) /  Tess Ledeux (f)
 December 3 & 4, 2021: WC #2 in  Steamboat (final)
 Winners:  Matěj Švancer (m) /  Eileen Gu (f)
 World Cup winners:  Matěj Švancer (m) /  Tess Ledeux (f)

Freeski Halfpipe
 December 8–10, 2021: WC #1 in  Copper Mountain
 Winners:  Alex Ferreira (m) /  Eileen Gu (f)
 December 30, 2021 – January 1: WC #2 in  Calgary
 Men's winner:  Brendan Mackay (2 times)
 Women's winner:  Eileen Gu (2 times)
 January 6 – 9: WC #3 in  Mammoth Mountain
 Winners:  Nico Porteous (m) /  Eileen Gu (f)
 World Cup winners:  Brendan Mackay (m) /  Eileen Gu (f)

Freeski Slopestyle
 November 19 & 20, 2021: WC #1 in  Stubai
 Winners:  Birk Ruud (m) /  Kelly Sildaru (f)
 January 6 – 9: WC #2 in  Mammoth Mountain
 Winners:  Alex Hall (m) /  Kelly Sildaru (f)
 January 14 – 16: WC #3 in  Font Romeu
 Winners:  Andri Ragettli (m) /  Tess Ledeux (f)
 March 3 – 5: WC #4 in  Bakuriani
 Winners:  Andri Ragettli (m) /  Megan Oldham (f)
 March 10 – 12: WC #5 in  Tignes
 Men's winner:  Birk Ruud
 March 24 – 26: WC #6 in  Silvaplana
 Winners:  Birk Ruud (m) /  Kelly Sildaru (f)
 World Cup Winners:  Andri Ragettli (m) /  Kelly Sildaru (f)

Moguls
 December 4, 2021: WC #1 in  Ruka
 Winners:  Mikaël Kingsbury (m) /  Olivia Giaccio (f)
 December 11, 2021: WC #2 in  Idre
 Winners:  Ikuma Horishima (m) /  Anri Kawamura (f)
 December 17, 2021: WC #3 in  Alpe d'Huez
 Winners:  Ikuma Horishima (m) /  Jakara Anthony (f)
 January 7 & 8: WC #4 in  Mont-Tremblant
 Men's winner:  Mikaël Kingsbury (2 times)
 Women's winners:  Anri Kawamura (1st) /  Perrine Laffont (2nd)
 January 13 & 14: WC #5 in  Deer Valley
 Men's winners:  Mikaël Kingsbury (1st) /  Ikuma Horishima (2nd)
 Women's winners:  Perrine Laffont (1st) /  Anri Kawamura (2nd)
 March 18: WC #6 in  Megève
 Winners:  Mikaël Kingsbury (m) /  Perrine Laffont (f)
 World Cup Winners:  Mikaël Kingsbury (m) /  Perrine Laffont (f)

Dual Moguls
 December 12, 2021: WC #1 in  Idre
 Winners:  Mikaël Kingsbury (m) /  Perrine Laffont (f)
 December 18, 2021: WC #2 in  Alpe d'Huez
 Winners:  Mikaël Kingsbury (m) /  Jakara Anthony (f)
 March 12: WC #3 in  Chiesa in Valmalenco
 Winners:  Mikaël Kingsbury (m) /  Jakara Anthony (f)
 March 19: WC #4 in  Megève
 Winners:  Mikaël Kingsbury (m) /  Perrine Laffont (f)
 World Cup Winners:  Mikaël Kingsbury (m) /  Jakara Anthony (f)

Ski Cross
 November 25 – 27, 2021: WC #1 in  Secret Garden
 Men's winner:  Sergey Ridzik
 Women's winner:  Sandra Näslund
 December 10 – 12, 2021: WC #2 in  Val Thorens
 Men's winners:  Terence Tchiknavorian /  Alex Fiva
 Women's winners:  Sandra Näslund (2 times)
 December 13 – 15, 2021: WC #3 in  Arosa
 Men's winner:  David Mobärg
 Women's winner:  Marielle Thompson
 Teams winner:  I (David Mobärg & Sandra Näslund)
 December 18 – 20, 2021: WC #4 in  Innichen
 Men's winners:  Ryan Regez (1st) /  Bastien Midol
 Women's winner:  Sandra Näslund (2 times)
 January 13 – 15: WC #5 in  Nakiska
 Men's winners:  David Mobärg (1st) /  Kristofor Mahler
 Women's winner:  Sandra Näslund (2 times)
 January 21 – 23: WC #6 in  Idre
 Men's winner:  Ryan Regez (2 times)
 Women's winner:  Sandra Näslund (2 times)
 March 11 – 13: WC #7 in  Reiteralm
 Men's winner:  Reece Howden
 Women's winner:  Sandra Näslund
 March 19: WC #8 in  Veysonnaz
 Men's winner:  David Mobärg
 Women's winner:  Sandra Näslund
 World Cup Winners:  Ryan Regez (m) /  Sandra Näslund (f)

2021–22 FIS Freestyle Europa Cup
Freeski Big Air
 January 6 – 8: EC #1 in  Les Arcs
 Winners:  Timothé Sivignon (m) /  Kim Dumont-Zanella (f)

Dual Moguls
 January 23: WC #1 in  Åre
 Winners:  Filip Gravenfors (m) /  Hanna Weese

Moguls
 January 22: WC #1 in  Åre
 Winners:  Rasmus Stegfeldt (m) /  Fantine Degroote (f)

Freeski Slopestyle
 January 19 – 21: EC #1 in  Alpe d'Huez
 Winners:  Miro Tabanelli (m) /  Jade Michaud (f)

Ski Cross
 November 21, 2021: EC #1 in  Pitztal
 Ski Cross winners:  Simone Deromedis (m) /  Jole Galli (f)
 November 24 & 25, 2021: EC #2 in  Pitztal
 Competition cancelled.
 November 27 & 28, 2021: EC #3 in  Idre
 Competition cancelled.
 December 10 & 11, 2021: EC #4 in  San Pellegrino Pass
 Competition cancelled.
 December 16 – 18, 2021: EC #5 in  Val Thorens
 Here the 3rd competition is cancelled.
 Men's winners:  Alexis Jay (1st) /  Mathias Graf (2nd)
 Women's winner:  Mylène Ballet-Baz (2 times)
 January 14 – 16: EC #6 in  Reiteralm
 Men's winner:  Mathias Graf (2 times)
 Women's winners:  Celia Funkler (1st) /  Saskja Lack (2nd)
 January 20 – 22: EC #7 in  Lenk
 Men's winners:  Luca Lubasch (1st) /  Mathias Graf (2nd)
 Women's winners:  Mylène Ballet-Baz (1st) /  Sonja Gigler (2nd)

2021–22 FIS Freestyle American Cup
Moguls
 January 20: NAC #1 in  Deer Valley
 Winners:  Julien Viel (m) /  Haruka Nakao (f)

Dual Moguls
 January 21: NAC #1 in  Deer Valley
 Winners:  Daniel Tanner (m) /  Kasey Hogg (f)

Ski Cross
 December 16 – 19, 2021: NAC #1 in  Nakiska
 Men's winners:  Alfred Wenk (1st) /  Phillip Tremblay (2nd)
 Women's winners:  Kiersten Wincett (1st) /  Sage Stefani (2nd)
 January 16 – 19: NAC #2 in  Nakiska
 Men's winners:  Reece Howden (2 times)
 Women's winners:  Brittany Phelan (2 times)

Nordic combined

2021–22 FIS Nordic Combined World Cup
 November 25–28, 2021: WC #1 in  Ruka
 Men's winners:  Jarl Magnus Riiber (2 times) /  Terence Weber
 December 3 – 5, 2021: WC #2 in  Lillehammer
 Men's winner:  Jarl Magnus Riiber
 Women's winner:  Gyda Westvold Hansen (2 times)
 Men's Team Relay winners:  (Espen Bjørnstad, Jens Lurås Oftebro, Jørgen Graabak, Jarl Magnus Riiber)
 December 10 – 12, 2021: WC #3 in  Otepää
 Men's winner:  Jarl Magnus Riiber (2 times)
 Women's winner:  Gyda Westvold Hansen (2 times)
 December 17 – 19, 2021: WC #4 in  Ramsau
 Women's winner:  Gyda Westvold Hansen
 Men's winner:  Jarl Magnus Riiber (2 times)
 January 7 – 9: WC #5 in  Val di Fiemme
 Mixed Team Relay winners:  (Jens Lurås Oftebro, Mari Leinan Lund, Gyda Westvold Hansen, Jørgen Graabak)
 Men's winners:  Johannes Lamparter (1st) /  Vinzenz Geiger (2nd)
 Women's winner:  Gyda Westvold Hansen
 January 14 – 16: WC #6 in  Klingenthal
 Men's winner:  Johannes Lamparter (2 times)
 January 21 – 23: WC #7 in  Planica
 Cancelled.
 January 27 – 30: WC #8 in  Seefeld
 Men's winners:  Jarl Magnus Riiber (1st) /  Vinzenz Geiger (2nd) /  Jørgen Graabak (3rd)
 February 25 – 27: WC #9 in  Lahti
 Men's Sprint Relay winners:  Jens Lurås Oftebro & Jørgen Graabak
 Men's winner:  Jarl Magnus Riiber
 March 4 – 6: WC #10 in  Oslo
 Men's winner:  Jarl Magnus Riiber (2 times)
 March 11 – 13: WC #11 in  Schonach
 Women's winners:  Anju Nakamura /  Gyda Westvold Hansen (2nd)
 Men's winner:  Jarl Magnus Riiber (2 times)
 World Cup winners:  Jarl Magnus Riiber (m) /  Gyda Westvold Hansen (f)

2021–22 FIS Nordic Combined Continental Cup
 November 25–27, 2021: CC #1 in  Nizhny Tagil
 Winner:  Jakob Lange (2 times)
 December 4 & 5, 2021: CC #2 in  Zhangjiakou
 Winner:  Jakob Lange (2 times)
 December 18 & 19, 2021: CC #3 in  Ruka
 Winners:  Andreas Skoglund (1st) /  Einar Lurås Oftebro (2nd)
 January 7 – 9: CC #4 in  Klingenthal
 Cancelled.
 January 21 – 23: CC #5 in  Klingenthal
 Winner:  Simen Tiller (3 times)

2021–2022 FIS Nordic combined Alpen Cup
Summer
 August 10, 2021: OPA #1 in  Klingenthal (Only women's)
 Winner:  Trine Göpfert
 August 14, 2021: OPA #2 in  Bischofsgrün (Only women's)
 Winner:  Trine Göpfert
 September 11 & 12, 2021: OPA #3 in  Oberwiesenthal
 Men's winner:  Iacopo Bortolas (2 times)
 Women's winner:  Silva Verbič (2 times)
 September 25 & 26, 2021: OPA #4 in  Tschagguns
 Men's winner:  Iacopo Bortolas (2 times)
 Women's winner:  Jenny Nowak (2 times)
 October 2 & 3, 2021: OPA #5 in  Predazzo
 Winners:  Jonathan Gräbert (m) /  Julia Schmidt (f)
 Men's Team winners:  II (Moritz Terei, Ansgar Schupp, Armin Peter)

Winter
 December 17 – 19, 2021: OPA #6 in  Seefeld
 Men's winners:  Jan Andersen (1st) /  Severin Reiter (2nd)
 Women's winners:  Silva Verbič (1st) /  Jenny Nowak (2nd)
 January 14 – 16: OPA #7 in  Schonach
 Men's winners:  Iacopo Bortolas (1st) /  Jiří Konvalinka (2nd)
 Women's winners:  Annika Sieff (2 times)

Ski jumping
 March 10 – 13: FIS Ski Flying World Championships 2022 in  Vikersund

2021–22 FIS Ski Jumping World Cup
 November 19 – 21, 2021: WC #1 in  Nizhny Tagil (Only men's)
 Winners:  Karl Geiger (1st) /  Halvor Egner Granerud (2nd)
 November 25 – 27, 2021: WC #2 in  Nizhny Tagil (Only women's)
 Winners:  Marita Kramer (1st) /  Ema Klinec (2nd)
 November 26 – 28, 2021: WC #3 in  Ruka (Only men's)
 Winners:  Ryōyū Kobayashi (1st) /  Anže Lanišek (2nd)
 December 3 – 5, 2021: WC #4 in  Lillehammer (Only women's)
 Winners:  Katharina Althaus (1st) /  Marita Kramer (2nd)
 December 3 – 5, 2021: WC #5 in  Wisla (Only men's)
 Winner:  Jan Hörl
 Teams winners:  (Manuel Fettner, Jan Hörl, Daniel Huber, Stefan Kraft)
 December 10 – 12, 2021: WC #6 in  Klingenthal
 Men's winners:  Stefan Kraft (1st) /  Ryōyū Kobayashi (2nd)
 Women's winner:  Marita Kramer (2 times)
 December 16 & 17, 2021: WC #7 in  Ramsau (Only women's)
 Winner:  Marita Kramer
 December 17 – 19, 2021: WC #8 in  Engelberg (Only men's)
 Winners:  Karl Geiger (1st) /  Ryōyū Kobayashi (2nd)
 December 29, 2021: WC #9 in  Oberstdorf (1st round of 2021–22 Four Hills Tournament)
 Winner:  Ryōyū Kobayashi
 December 31, 2021: WC #11 in  Ljubno (Only women's) (1st round of 2021–22 Silvester Tournament)
 Winners  Nika Križnar
 January 1: WC #10 in  Ljubno (Only women's) (2nd round of 2021–22 Silvester Tournament)
 Winner:  Sara Takanashi 
 January 1: WC #12 in  Garmisch-Partenkirchen (2nd round of 2021–22 Four Hills Tournament)
 Winner:  Ryōyū Kobayashi
 January 5 & 6: WC #13 in  Bischofshofen (3rd and 4th round of 2021–22 Four Hills Tournament)
 Winners:  Ryōyū Kobayashi (1st) /  Daniel Huber (2nd)
 2021–22 Four Hills Tournament winner:  Ryōyū Kobayashi
 January 7 – 9: WC #14 in  Sapporo (Only women's)
 Cancelled due to the COVID-19 pandemic.
 January 8 & 9: WC #15 in  Bischofshofen (Only men's)
 Winner:  Marius Lindvik
 Teams winners:  (Manuel Fettner, Jan Hörl, Philipp Aschenwald, Daniel Huber)
 January 13 – 15: WC #16 in  Zaō (Only women's)
 Cancelled due to the COVID-19 pandemic.
 January 14 – 16: WC #17 in  Zakopane (Only men's)
 Winner:  Marius Lindvik
 Teams winners:  (Lovro Kos, Peter Prevc, Timi Zajc, Anže Lanišek)
 January 20 – 23: WC #18 in  Sapporo (Only men's)
 Cancelled due to the COVID-19 pandemic.
 January 21 – 23: WC #19 in  Titisee-Neustadt (Only men's)
 Winner:  Karl Geiger (2 times)
 January 28 – 30: WC #20 in  Willingen
 Mixed teams winners:  (Ema Klinec, Cene Prevc, Urša Bogataj, Anže Lanišek)
 Men's winners:  Ryōyū Kobayashi (1st) /  Marius Lindvik (2nd)
 Women's winners:  Marita Kramer (1st) /  Nika Križnar (2nd)
 February 25 – 27: WC #21 in  Lahti (Only men's)
 Winners:  Stefan Kraft (1st) /  Ryōyū Kobayashi &  Halvor Egner Granerud (2nd, same points)
 Teams winners:  (Jan Hörl, Clemens Aigner, Ulrich Wohlgenannt, Stefan Kraft)
 March 2 & 3: WC #22 in  Lillehammer
 Men's winner:  Stefan Kraft
 Women's winners:  Sara Takanashi (1st) /  Marita Kramer (2nd)
 March 5 & 6: WC #23 in  Oslo
 Men's winners:  Marius Lindvik (1st) /  Daniel-André Tande (2nd)
 Women's winners:  Silje Opseth (1st) /  Sara Takanashi (2nd)
 March 11 – 13: WC #24 in  Oberhof (Only women's)
 Winner:  Urša Bogataj (2 times)
 March 18 – 20: WC #25 in  Oberstdorf (Only men's)
 Winners:  Stefan Kraft (1st) /  Timi Zajc (2nd)
 March 24 – 27: WC #26 in  Planica (Only men's)
 Winner:  Žiga Jelar (1st) /  Marius Lindvik (2nd)
 Teams winners:  (Žiga Jelar, Peter Prevc, Timi Zajc, Anže Lanišek)
 World Cup winners:  Ryōyū Kobayashi (m) /  Marita Kramer (f)

2021–22 FIS Ski Jumping Continental Cup
Summer
 July 17 & 18, 2021: COC #1 in  Kuopio (The competition organized by Chinese Ski Association at the Finnish hill.)
 Men's winners:  David Siegel (1st) /  Eetu Nousiainen (2nd)
 Women's winners:  Birun Shao (1st) /  Maria Yakovleva (2nd)
 August 13 & 14, 2021: COC #2 in  Frenštát (Only men's)
 Winners:  Viktor Polášek (1st) /  Mika Schwann (2nd)
 August 21 & 22, 2021: COC #3 in  Râșnov
 Men's winners:  Manuel Fettner (1st) /  Mika Schwann (2nd)
 Women's winner:  Jerneja Brecl (2 times)
 September 11 & 12, 2021: COC #4 in  Bischofshofen (Only men's)
 Men's winners:  Manuel Fettner (1st) /  Daniel Tschofenig (2nd)
 September 18 & 19, 2021: COC #5 in  Oslo 
 Men's winners:  Andreas Granerud Buskum (1st) /  Fredrik Villumstad (2nd)
 Women's winner:  Katharina Althaus (2 times)
 September 25 & 26, 2021: COC #6 in  Klingenthal (Only men's)
 Men's winners:  Timon Pascal Kahofer (1st) /  Manuel Fettner (2nd)
Winter
 December 4 & 5, 2021: COC #1 in  Zhangjiakou
 Men's winners:  David Siegel (1st) /  Ulrich Wohlgenannt (2nd)
 Women's winners:  Maria Yakovleva (1st) /  Diana Toropchenova (2nd)
 December 10 – 12, 2021: COC #2 in  Vikersundbakken
 Men's winners:  Ulrich Wohlgenannt (1st) /  Severin Freund (2nd)
 Women's winners:  Jerneja Repinc Zupančič (1st) /  Sophie Sorschag (2nd)
 December 17 & 18, 2021: COC #3 in  Notodden (Women's only)
 Winner:  Sophie Sorschag (2 times)
 December 18 & 19, 2021: COC #4 in  Ruka (Only men's)
 Winner:  Robin Pedersen (2 times)
 December 27 & 28, 2021: COC #5 in  Engelberg (Only men's)
 Winners:  Benjamin Østvold (1st) /  Sondre Ringen (2nd)
 January 7 & 8: COC #6 in  Titisee-Neustadt
 Cancelled
 January 14 – 16: COC #7 in  Oberstdorf (Only men's)
 Winner:  Ulrich Wohlgenannt (2 times)
 January 15 & 16: COC #8 in  Okurayama (Only men's)
 Cancelled
 January 21 – 23: COC #9 in  Innsbruck
 Men's winner:  Anže Semenič (2 times)
 Women's winner:  Sara Takanashi (2 times)

2021 FIS Ski Jumping Grand Prix
 July 16–18, 2021: GP #1 in  Wisła
 Men's winners:  Jakub Wolny (1st) /  Dawid Kubacki (2nd)
 Women's winner:  Urša Bogataj (2 times)
 August 5–7, 2021: GP #2 in  Courchevel
 Winners:  Stefan Kraft (m) /  Urša Bogataj (f)
 August 15 & 15, 2021: GP #3 in  Frenštát (Only women's)
 Winner:  Sara Takanashi
 September 3–5, 2021: GP #4 in  Shchuchinsk (Only men's)
 Men's winner:  Halvor Egner Granerud (2 times)
 September 10–12, 2021: GP #5 in  Chaykovsky
 Men's winner:  Halvor Egner Granerud
 Women's winners:  Urša Bogataj (1st) /  Irina Avvakumova (2nd)
 Mixed Team winners:  (Anna Odine Strøm, Johann André Forfang, Silje Opseth, Halvor Egner Granerud)
 September 17–19, 2021: GP #6 in  Râșnov
 Cancelled.
 September 24 & 25, 2021: GP #7 in  Hinzenbach (Only men's)
 Winner:  Yukiya Satō
 October 1 & 2, 2021: GP #8 in  Klingenthal
 Winners:  Ryoyu Kobayashi (m) /  Marita Kramer (f)

2021–2022 FIS Cup
Summer
 July 3 & 4, 2021: FC #1 in  Otepää
 Men's winner:  Mika Schwann (2 times)
 Women's winner:  Maria Yakovleva (2 times)
 July 15 & 16, 2021: FC #2 in  Kuopio (The competition organized by Chinese Ski Association at the Finnish hill.)
 Men's winners:  Thomas Lackner (1st) /  Eetu Nousiainen (2nd)
 Women's winners:  Birun Shao (1st) /  Hannah Wiegele (2nd)
 August 25, 2021: FC #3 in  Prémanon–Les Tuffes (Only women's)
 Cancelled.
 August 26 & 27, 2021: FC #4 in  Gérardmer (Only women's)
 Winners:  Joséphine Pagnier (1st) /  Julia Clair (2nd)
 August 28 & 29, 2021: FC #5 in  Einsiedeln
 Men's winners:  Thomas Diethart (1st) /  Clemens Aigner (2nd)
 Women's winner:  Sina Arnet (2 times)
 September 4 & 5, 2021: FC #6 in  Ljubno ob Savinji
 Men's winners:  Janni Reisenauer (1st) /  Francisco Mörth (2nd)
 Women's winners:  Nika Križnar (1st) /  Qingyue Peng (2nd)
 September 18 & 19, 2021: FC #7 in  Villach
 Men's winner:  Janni Reisenauer (2 times)
 Women's winners:  Nika Prevc (1st) /  Lara Malsiner (2nd)
 September 25 & 26, 2021: FC #8 in  Pyeongchang
 Cancelled.
 September 25 & 26, 2021: FC #9 in  Lahti (The competition organized by Chinese Ski Association at the Finnish hill.) (Only men's)
 Men's winner:  Andre Fussenegger (2 times)

Winter
 November 13 & 14, 2021: FC #10 in  Falun
 Men's winners:  Peter Resinger (1st) /  Maximilian Ortner (2nd)
 Women's winner:  Irina Avvakumova (2 times)
 December 10–12, 2021: FC #11 in  Kandersteg
 Men's winners:  Francisco Mörth (1st) /  Elias Medwed (2nd)
 Women's winner:  Emma Chervet (2 times)
 December 17 & 18, 2021: FC #12 in  Notodden (Only men's)
 Winner:  Clemens Aigner (2 times)
 January 8 & 9: FC #13 in  Zakopane (Only men's)
 Cancelled.

2021–2022 FIS Ski Jumping Alpen Cup
Summer
 August 9 & 10, 2021: OPA #1 in  Klingenthal (Only women's)
 Winners:  Emely Torazza (1st) /  Anna-Fay Scharfenberg (2nd)
 August 12, 2021: OPA #2 in  Pöhla (Only women's)
 Winner:  Emely Torazza
 August 14 & 15, 2021: OPA #3 in  Bischofsgrün (Only women's)
 Winner:  Nika Prevc (2 times)
 September 11 & 12, 2021: OPA #4 in  Liberec
 Men's winner:  Maximilian Ortner (2 times)
 Women's winners:  Nika Prevc (1st) /  Jerneja Repinc Zupančič (2nd)
 September 24–26, 2021: OPA #5 in  Kandersteg
 Men's winner:  Maximilian Ortner (2 times)
 Women's winners:  Nika Prevc (1st) /  Jerneja Repinc Zupančič (2nd)
 October 2 & 3, 2021: OPA #6 in  Predazzo
 Winners:  Janne Holz (m) /  Tina Erzar (f)

Winter
 December 17 & 18, 2021: OPA #7 in  Seefeld
 Men's winners:  Mark Hafnar (1st) /  Maksim Bartolj (2nd)
 Women's winners:  Nika Prevc (1st) /  Taja Bodlaj (2nd)
 January 14 – 16: OPA #8 in  Oberhof
 Men's winners:  Markus Müller (1st) / (2nd)
 Women's winners:  Nika Prevc (2 times)

Ski mountaineering

2021–22 ISMF World Cup Ski Mountaineering
 December 16 – 19, 2021: WC #1 in  Pontedilegno-Tonale
 Sprint winners:  Arno Lietha (m) /  Emily Harrop (f)
 Vertical winners:  Rémi Bonnet (m) /  Axelle Gachet Mollaret (f)
 Individual winners:  Xavier Gachet (m) /  Axelle Gachet Mollaret (f)
 January 15 & 16: WC #2 in  Comapedrosa
 Individual winners:  Michele Boscacci (m) /  Axelle Gachet Mollaret (f)
 Vertical winners:  Rémi Bonnet (m) /  Tove Alexandersson (f)
 January 27 – 29: WC #3 in  Morgins
 Sprint winners:  Oriol Cardona Coll (m) /  Marianna Jagerčíková (f)
 Individual winners:  Xavier Gachet (m) /  Axelle Gachet Mollaret (f)
 February 3 – 5: WC #4 in  Caspoggio
 Individual winners:  Xavier Gachet (m) /  Axelle Gachet Mollaret (f)
 Sprint winners:  Oriol Cardona Coll (m) /  Emily Harrop (f)
 March 18 – 20: WC #5 in  Val Martello
 Individual winners:  Davide Magnini (m) /  Axelle Gachet Mollaret (f)
 Sprint winners:  Oriol Cardona Coll (m) /  Emily Harrop (f)
 April 6 – 9: WC #6 in  Flaine
 Individual winners:  Rémi Bonnet (m) /  Axelle Gachet Mollaret (f)
 Vertical winners:  Rémi Bonnet (m) /  Tove Alexandersson (f)
 Sprint winners:  Arno Lietha (m) /  Emily Harrop (f)

Snowboarding

2021–22 FIS Snowboard World Cup
Big Air
 October 23, 2021: WC #1 in  Chur
 Winners:  Jonas Boesiger (m) /  Kokomo Murase (f)
 December 2 – 4, 2021: WC #2 in  Steamboat
 Winners:  Su Yiming (m) /  Reira Iwabuchi (f)
 World Cup winners:  Jonas Boesiger (m) /  Anna Gasser (f)

Halfpipe
 December 9 – 11, 2021: WC #1 in  Copper Mountain
 Winners:  Ruka Hirano (m) /  Cai Xuetong (f)
 January 6 – 8: WC #2 in  Mammoth Mountain
 Winners:  Ayumu Hirano (m) /  Ruki Tomita (f)
 January 13 – 15: WC #3 in  Laax
 Winners:  Ayumu Hirano (m) /  Chloe Kim (f)
 World Cup winners:  Ayumu Hirano (m) /  Cai Xuetong (f)

Parallel
 December 11 – 12, 2021: WC #1 in  Lake Bannoye
 Parallel giant slalom winners:  Lee Sang-ho (m) /  Sofia Nadyrshina (f)
 Parallel slalom winners:  Andreas Prommegger (m) /  Julie Zogg (f)
 December 16, 2021: WC #2 in  Carezza
 Parallel giant slalom winners:  Stefan Baumeister (m) /  Daniela Ulbing (f)
 December 18, 2021: WC #3 in  Cortina d'Ampezzo
 Parallel giant slalom winners:  Dario Caviezel (m) /  Ester Ledecká (f)
 January 8: WC #4 in  Scuol
 Parallel giant slalom winners:  Dmitry Loginov (m) /  Sabine Schöffmann (f)
 January 11 & 12: WC #5 in  Bad Gastein
 Parallel slalom winners:  Arvid Auner (m) /  Daniela Ulbing (f)
 Mixed team parallel slalom winners:  IV (Arvid Auner & Julia Dujmovits)
 January 14 & 15: WC #6 in  Simonhöhe
 Parallel giant slalom winners:  Stefan Baumeister (m) /  Aleksandra Król (f)
 Mixed team parallel giant slalom winners:  III (Alexander Payer & Sabine Schöffmann)
 March 12 & 13: WC #7 in  Piancavallo
 Parallel slalom winners:  Marc Hofer (m) /  Tsubaki Miki &  Julie Zogg (f, same time)
 Mixed team parallel slalom winners:  II (Benjamin Karl & Daniela Ulbing)
 March 16: WC #8 in  Rogla
 Parallel giant slalom winners:  Edwin Coratti (m) /  Ramona Theresia Hofmeister (f)
 March 19 & 20: WC #9 in  Berchtesgaden
 Parallel slalom winners:  Edwin Coratti &  Andreas Prommegger (m, same time) /  Julie Zogg (f)
 Mixed team parallel slalom winners:  IX (Stefan Baumeister & Ramona Theresia Hofmeister)
 World Cup winners:  Lee Sang-ho (m) /  Ramona Theresia Hofmeister (f)

Slopestyle
 December 29, 2021 – January 2: WC #1 in  Calgary
 Winners:  Sébastien Toutant (m) /  Kokomo Murase (f)
 January 6 – 8: WC #2 in  Mammoth Mountain
 Winners:  Red Gerard (m) /  Jamie Anderson (f)
 January 13 – 15: WC #3 in  Laax
 Winners:  Sean Fitzsimons (m) /  Tess Coady (f)
 March 3 – 6: WC #4 in  Bakuriani
 Winners:  Leon Vockensperger (m) /  Laurie Blouin (f)
 March 18 – 19: WC #5 in  Špindlerův Mlýn
 Winners:  Tiarn Collins (m) /  Kokomo Murase (f)
 March 25 – 27: WC #6 in  Laax
 Winners:  Marcus Kleveland (m) /  Anna Gasser (f)
 World Cup winners:  Tiarn Collins (m) /  Kokomo Murase (f)

Snowboard Cross
 November 26 – 28, 2021: WC #1 in  Secret Garden
 Winners:  Alessandro Hämmerle (m) /  Eva Samková (f)
 December 9 – 11, 2021: WC #2 in  Montafon
 Winners:  Alessandro Hämmerle (m) /  Charlotte Bankes (f)
 Teams winner:  (Lorenzo Sommariva & Michela Moioli)
 December 17 & 18, 2021: WC #3 in  Cervinia
 Winners:  Jakob Dusek (m) /  Michela Moioli (f)
 January 7 – 9: WC #4 in  Krasnoyarsk
 Men's winner:  Martin Nörl (2 times)
 Women's winner:  Charlotte Bankes (2 times)
 January 21 & 22: WC #5 in  Chiesa in Valmalenco
 Cancelled.
 January 28 & 29: WC #6 in  Cortina d'Ampezzo
 Winners:  Martin Nörl (m) /  Michela Moioli (f)
 March 10 – 12: WC #7 in  Reiteralm
 Winners:  Lorenzo Sommariva (m) /  Charlotte Bankes (f)
 March 20: WC #8 in  Veysonnaz
 Winners:  Éliot Grondin (m) /  Charlotte Bankes (f)
 World Cup winners:  Martin Nörl (m) /  Charlotte Bankes (f)

2021–22 FIS Snowboard Europa Cup
Big Air
 January 4 & 5: EC #1 in  Les Arcs
 Cancelled.
 January 13: EC #2 in  Vars
 Cancelled.

Snowboard Cross
 November 24 & 25, 2021: EC #1 in  Pitztal
 Cancelled.
 January 8 & 9: EC #2 in  Puy-Saint-Vincent
 Cancelled.
 January 22 & 23: EC #3 in  Reiteralm
 Here, 1st competition is cancelled.
 Winners:  Álvaro Romero Villanueva (m) /  Aline Albrecht (f)

Parallel
 December 11 & 12, 2021: EC #1 in  Bischofswiesen
 Men's Parallel Slalom winner:  Marc Hofer (2 times)
 Women's Parallel Slalom winners:  Xenia Spörri (1st) /  Darina Klink (2nd)
 December 18 & 19, 2021: EC #2 in  Monínec
 Men's Parallel Slalom winners:  Sebastian Schüler (1st) /  Dominik Burgstaller (2nd)
 Women's Parallel Slalom winners:  Olga Naidiakina (1st) /  Weronika Dawidek (2nd)
 January 22 & 23: EC #3 in  Bukovel
 Men's Parallel Giant Slalom winners:  Matthäus Pink (1st) /  Dominik Burgstaller (2nd)
 Women's Parallel Giant Slalom winners:  Annamari Dancha (1st) /  Elisa Caffont (2nd)

Slopestyle
 November 19, 2021: EC #1 in  Landgraaf
 Winners:  Leon Gütl (m) /  Mia Brookes (f)
 January 13: EC #2 in  Vars
 Cancelled.
 January 22 & 23: EC #3 in  Prato Nevoso
 Winners:  Emil Zulian (m) /  Telma Särkipaju (f)

2022 FIS Snowboard North American Cup
Parallel
 January 21 & 22: NAC #1 in  Giants Ridge
 Parallel Giant Slalom winners:  Ryan Rosencranz (m) /  Iris Pflum (f)
 Parallel Slalom winners:  Dylan Udolf (m) /  Alexa Bullis (f)

Slopestyle
 January 19 – 21: NAC #1 in  Sun Peaks
 Men's winners:  Lane Weaver (1st) /  Jaxson Moon (2nd)
 Women's winners:  Danielle Weiler (2 times)

Snowboard Cross
 January 11 – 13: NAC #1 in  Sunshine Village
 Men's winners:  Tristan Bell (2 times)
 Women's winners:  Acy Craig (1st) /  Brenna O'Brien (2nd)

Telemark skiing
 March 9 – 11: 2022 FIS Telemark skiing Junior World Championships in  Mürren

2022 Telemark skiing World Cup
 January 14 & 15: WC #1 in  Samoëns
 Cancelled.
 January 21 & 22: WC #2 in  Pralognan-la-Vanoise
 Cancelled.
 January 24 & 25: WC #3 in  Saint-Gervais-les-Bains
 Sprint winners:  Trym Nygaard Løken (m) /  Laly Chaucheprat (f)
 Classic winners:  Bastien Dayer (m) /  Martina Wyss (f)
 January 27 – 30: WC #4 in  Melchsee-Frutt
 Sprint winners:  Bastien Dayer (m) /  Martina Wyss (f)
 Classic winners:  Bastien Dayer (m) /  Martina Wyss (f)
 Men's Parallel Sprint winner:  Trym Nygaard Løken (2 times)
 Women's Parallel Sprint winners:  Martina Wyss (1st) /  Argeline Tan-Bouquet (2nd)
 February 2 & 3: WC #5 in  Villars-sur-Ollon
 Cancelled.
 February 17 – 19: WC #6 in  Ål
 Classic winners:  Bastien Dayer (m) /  Martina Wyss (f)
 Sprint winners:  Bastien Dayer (m) /  Martina Wyss (f)
 Parallel Sprint winners:  Bastien Dayer (m) /  Martina Wyss (f)
 March 6 & 7: WC #7 in  Les Houches
 Men's Sprint winners:  Élie Nabot (1st) /  Bastien Dayer (2nd)
 Women's Sprint winners:  Jasmin Taylor (1st) /  Martina Wyss (2nd)
 March 9 – 11: WC #7 in  Mürren
 Classic winners:  Bastien Dayer (m) /  Martina Wyss (f)
 Sprint winners:  Jacob Alveberg (m) /  Martina Wyss (f)
 Parallel Sprint winners:  Bastien Dayer (m) /  Jasmin Taylor (f)
 March 18 – 20: WC #8 in  Krvavec (final)
 Classic winners:  Théo Sillon (m) /  Martina Wyss (f)
 Sprint winners:  Bastien Dayer (m) /  Martina Wyss (f)
 Parallel Sprint winners:  Bastien Dayer (m) /  Johanna Holzmann (f)

References

Skiing
Skiing
Skiing
Skiing
Skiing by year